Luciana Alexandra Gómez Del Río (born 22 September 1984) is a Uruguayan footballer who plays as a goalkeeper for Rampla Juniors. She has been a member of the Uruguay women's national team.

Club career
Gómez played in Uruguay for Nacional, Peñarol and Rampla Juniors.

International career
An unused goalkeeper at the 2003 South American Women's Football Championship, Gómez played for Uruguay at senior level in two Copa América Femenina editions (2006 and 2014) and the 2007 Pan American Games.

References 

1984 births
Living people
Women's association football goalkeepers
Uruguayan women's footballers
Uruguay women's international footballers
Pan American Games competitors for Uruguay
Footballers at the 2007 Pan American Games
Club Nacional de Football players
Peñarol players
Rampla Juniors players